The Reverend Professor Thomas Glyn Watkin KC (born 1952) is a Welsh lawyer and the first person to be appointed to the post of First Legislative Counsel to the Welsh Government, taking up his post in April 2007.

First Legislative Counsel
Working within the Office of the Legislative Counsel, part of the Welsh Government, Professor Watkin had responsibility for the drafting of the Welsh Government's legislative programme following the implementation of the Government of Wales Act 2006.

Education
Thomas Glyn Watkin was born in the village of Cwmparc in the Rhondda in 1952. He studied law at Pembroke College, Oxford, where he was Oades and Stafford Scholar (1971-1974). He obtained the degrees of BA (1974), BCL (1975) and MA (1977) from the University of Oxford and was called to the bar by the Middle Temple (1976).

Professional career
From 1975 until 2004, he was successively lecturer, senior lecturer, reader and professor in the Law School at the University of Wales, Cardiff, as well as acting as Legal Assistant to the Governing Body of the Church in Wales from 1981 until 1998. He was appointed foundation Professor of Law at the University of Wales, Bangor in 2004.

Known mainly for his work in legal history and civil law, Professor Watkin is a council member of the Selden Society, Secretary and Treasurer of the Welsh Legal History Society and a member of the editorial board of the Journal of Legal History. He was elected to the Academy of Private Lawyers of Milan and Pavia in 2002, and is an ordained priest in the Church in Wales.

In 2019 Professor Watkin was appointed as Queen's Counsel honoris causa. Upon his appointment the Lord Chancellor, David Gauke MP, referred to Professor Watkin's role as the Welsh Government's "...first principal Legislative Draftsman", noting that he was "involved centrally in establishing and building the legislative drafting capacity of the Welsh Government – in both English and Welsh – in the initial years of primary legislative devolution for Wales".

Publications
His principal publications include The Nature of Law (1980), The Italian Legal Tradition (1998) and  An Historical Introduction to Modern Civil Law (1999), and, as editor, Legal Record and Historical Reality (1989), The Europeanization of Law (1997),  Legal Wales: Its Past; Its Future (2001), The Trial of Dic Penderyn and Other Essays (2003)  and Y Cyfraniad Cymreig (2005). His book, Wales: An Introduction to its Legal History, was published in the autumn of 2005.

Offices held

References

1952 births
Living people
Members of HM Government Legal Service
Civil servants in the Welsh Assembly Government
Alumni of Pembroke College, Oxford
Welsh barristers
Members of the Middle Temple
People from Treorchy
Academics of Cardiff University
Academics of Bangor University